Dudhnoi College, established in 1972, is a general degree college situated in Dudhnoi, Assam. This college is affiliated with the Gauhati University.

Departments

Science
Physics
Mathematics
Chemistry
Statistics
Computer Science
Anthropology
Botany
Zoology

Arts
 Assamese
 English
 Bodo
 Garo
History
Education
Economics
Philosophy
Political Science
Geography

Commerce

References

External links
 

Colleges in Assam
Colleges affiliated to Gauhati University
Educational institutions established in 1972
1972 establishments in Assam